The Lady with the Dog (translit. Dama s sobachkoy) is a 1960 Soviet drama film directed by Iosif Kheifits. It was entered into the 1960 Cannes Film Festival.

Plot
The film is set in the 19th Century at Yalta, the popular Russian  resort on the Black Sea. Dmitri  Gurov, Moscow banker, meets Anna Sergeyevna from Saratov, also vacationing.  Beautiful Anna walks her dog daily to the delight of the men who observe her.  Both Dmitri and Anna are married and both are unhappy in their situations.  Both have come to Yalta without their spouses.  A romance soon blooms into an affair.  After their summer romance ends, both return to their marriages.

Dmitri returns to his former life, bored with working and going to his club to play cards.  He is haunted by Anna's memory.  At Christmas, Dmitri tells his wife he is going to St. Petersburg on business but actually goes to Saratov where he finally locates Anna who is attending an opera with her husband.  Seizing an opportunity, he surprises her.  She fears detection and promises to meet him in Moscow in a few weeks. Anna meets Dmitri in Moscow, their love fully rekindles, but they are frustrated with the reality that their marriages cannot be dissolved and they must meet secretly from then on.  They make tentative plans to meet in the future.  The closing scene has Anna looking from the window of her Moscow room while Dmitri leaves in the cold of the Russian winter.

Cast
 Iya Savvina as Anna Sergeyevna
 Aleksey Batalov as Dimitri Gurov
 Nina Alisova as Madame Gurov
 Pantelejmon Krymov as von Didenitz
 Yuri Medvedev
 Vladimir Erenberg
 Yakov Gudkin
 D. Zebrov as Frolov
 Mariya Safonova as Natasha
 G. Barysheva
 Zinaida Dorogova
 Kirill Gun
 Mikhail Ivanov
 G. Kurovsky
 Svetlana Mazovetskaya
 Aleksandr Orlov
 Pavel Pervushin

See also
Dark Eyes (1987)

References

External links

1960 films
1960 drama films
1960s Russian-language films
Soviet black-and-white films
Films based on works by Anton Chekhov
Films directed by Iosif Kheifits
Films set in Crimea
Lenfilm films
Soviet drama films